Dimitrios Rafail Moraitis (alternate spelling: Dimitris Rafail Moraitis) (born February 3, 1999) is a Greek professional basketball player for Peristeri of the Greek Basket League. He is 1.94 m (6 ft 4 in) tall, and he can play at both the point guard and shooting guard positions, with point guard being his main position.

Youth career
Moraitis played from a young age with the youth teams of Panionios, before he started his pro career. He played at the Jordan Brand Classic's International Game in 2015, where he recorded 7 points, 1 assist, 1 block, and 1 turnover in 28 minutes.

Professional career
Moraitis signed his first contract with the senior men's team of Panionios in 2014. On 20 July 2015, AEK Athens confirmed that Moraitis would join the club from Panionios, for a transfer buyout amount fee of €1,200,000. Moraitis signed a six-year contract with AEK.

Moraitis made his Greek League debut with AEK, in a win against Nea Kifissia, on November 21, 2015. He scored his first points in the Greek League, in a game against Rethymno Cretan Kings, on March 11, 2016, but his team lost the game, 70–69. After the departure of Taurean Green from AEK, due to an episode he had with the team's head coach, Jure Zdovc, during a 2016 Greek League playoffs game against Olympiacos, Moraitis gained some more playing time.

With AEK, he won the Greek Cup title, in 2018, and the FIBA Champions League title as well. On July 27, 2018, Moraitis extended his contract with AEK for an extra year, through the 2021–22 season. During the preseason of the 2018–19 season, Moraitis played with AEK at the "Neophytos Chandriotis" tournament. AEK won the tournament, and Moraitis was named the MVP, averaging 11.6 points, 4 assists, and 2.3 rebounds per game.

On August 17, 2019, Moraitis was loaned to Kolossos Rodou of the Greek Basket League for the 2019-2020 season.

On July 23, 2021, Moraitis signed a two-year deal with Peristeri. During the 2021-22 campaign, in a total of 21 league games, he averaged 9.3 points, 3.3 rebounds, 4.5 assists and 1.2 steals, playing around 23 minutes per contest. On July 1, 2022, Moraitis signed a new two-year contract with the club through 2024, now playing under coach Vassilis Spanoulis.

National team career
Moraitis has been a member of the junior national teams of Greece. With Greece's junior national teams, he has played at the following tournaments: the 2014 FIBA Europe Under-16 Championship, the 2015 FIBA Europe Under-16 Championship, the 2016 FIBA Europe Under-18 Championship, the 2017 FIBA Europe Under-18 Championship, and the 2018 FIBA Europe Under-20 Championship.

Personal life
Moraitis' father, Kostas Moraitis, is a former professional basketball player, who played in the Greek League during the 1990s.

Career statistics

Domestic leagues

Regular season

|-
| 2014–15
| style="text-align:left;"| Panionios
| align=left | GBL
| 3  || 8.5 || .454 || .571 || 1.000 || 1.3 || 1.0 || 1.6 || 0 || 5.0
|-
| 2015–16
| style="text-align:left;"| A.E.K.
| align=center | GBL
| 2  || 4.2 || .500 || .500 || – || .5 || 0 || 0 || 0 || 1.5
|-
| 2016–17
| style="text-align:left;"| A.E.K.
| align=center | GBL
| 3  || 2.5 || .000 || – || .500 || .3 || 0 || 0 || 0 || .3
|-
| 2017–18
| style="text-align:left;"| A.E.K.
| align=center | GBL
| 6  || 6.4 || .625 || .500 || .750 || .5 || 1.0 || .5 || 0 || 2.7
|-
| 2018–19
| style="text-align:left;"| A.E.K.
| align=center | GBL
| 21  || 11.1 || .333 || .258 || .440 || 1.4 || 1.7 || .5 || 0 || 2.6
|}

Playoffs

|-
| 2015–16
| style="text-align:left;"| A.E.K.
| align=center | GBL
| 3  || 4.2 || .000 || .000 || – || 0.3 || 0 || 0.3 || 0 || 0
|-
| 2016–17
| style="text-align:left;"| A.E.K.
| align=center | GBL
| 3  || 11.4 || .400|| .500 || .000 || 0.3 || 0 || 0.7 || 0 || 3,7
|-
|}

FIBA Champions League

|-
| style="text-align:left;" | 2016–17
| style="text-align:left;" | A.E.K.
| 1 || 3.3 || .000 || .000 || – || 0 || 0 || 0 || 0 || 0
|-
| style="text-align:left;background:#AFE6BA;" | 2017–18†
| style="text-align:left;" | A.E.K.
| 4 || 1.7 || .000 || .000 || – || .3 || 0 || 0 || 0 || 0
|-
| style="text-align:left;" | 2018–19
| style="text-align:left;" | A.E.K.
| 9 || 9.2 || .250 || .182 || .875 || .9 || .8 || .4 || .1 || 2.1
|}

References

External links
 EuroCup Profile
 FIBA Profile (archive)
 FIBA Europe Profile
 Eurobasket.com Profile
 Greek League Profile 
 Greek League Profile 
 Draftexpress.com Profile
 NBADraft.net Profile
 Realgm.com Profile

1999 births
Living people
AEK B.C. players
Greek men's basketball players
Greek Basket League players
Panionios B.C. players
Peristeri B.C. players
Point guards
Shooting guards
Basketball players from Athens